Crown Princess is a Crown-class cruise ship owned and operated by Princess Cruises. Her maiden voyage took place on 14 June 2006, departing Red Hook, Brooklyn (New York) for Grand Turk (Turks & Caicos), Ocho Rios (Jamaica), Grand Cayman (Cayman Islands), and Port Canaveral (Florida).

As of 2019, Crown Princess sails in the Caribbean during the Winter season, and in Europe for the Summer season. Her godmother is Martha Stewart.

Galveston
In December 2012, Crown Princess made a transatlantic crossing from Venice to Galveston, Texas where she stayed to run Caribbean itineraries from December 2012 to April 2013. When the ship arrived in Galveston on 22 December 2012, at least 102 passengers had contracted norovirus.  The Crown Princess had previously been plagued by two separate outbreaks of norovirus in January/February 2012.

Listing incident
On 18 July 2006, at approximately 3:30 pm ET, one hour after departing her last port of call in Port Canaveral, Crown Princess reported "listing" or making "heavy turns".  The United States Coast Guard was contacted shortly after and crews arrived within minutes to assist the troubled vessel. The cruise ship was on its way back to New York City, and the decision was made to return to Port Canaveral due to what was initially thought to be a malfunction in the steering equipment which caused a severe tilting of the ship, and injuries.

However, the United States' National Transportation Safety Board (NTSB) found that the second officer, the senior watch officer on the bridge, had disengaged the automatic steering mode of the vessel's integrated navigation system after it put the ship into what the officer felt was an unusually hard turn to port and took manual control of the steering. The second officer turned the wheel first to port and then from port to starboard several times, eventually causing the vessel to list even more, to a maximum angle of about 24° to starboard. The severe listing tumbled passengers, crew members, pool water, and everything else not secured about the decks.

Fourteen passengers and crew members were seriously injured, one suffering breathing difficulties after being hit in the chest by an airborne chair, and another 284 had minor injuries. Water from the four on-board pools poured into staircases and lift shafts. Most injuries were on the outdoor areas of Decks 15 and 16, where large beach chairs and tables hit and injured passengers. The other area that had many injured passengers was the balcony areas in the grand atrium. Many there were hit by falling objects and heavy marble tables.

The matter was referred to the NTSB and United States Coast Guard for investigation. After an internal review by Princess Cruises, its president Alan Buckelew publicly stated that "the incident was due to human error and the appropriate personnel changes have been made."

With approval from the Coast Guard and the Bermuda flag authorities, the vessel returned to service. A full refund was given to all passengers on the ill-fated cruise, and a 50% refund to passengers on the following cruise which was set to depart 20 July but instead departed from Brooklyn on 22 July. Since then, Crown Princess has resumed her normal schedule.

Cruising history
Until November 2012, Crown Princess was sailing the Mediterranean. In November 2012 the ship sailed to Galveston, Texas for the first time; where she sailed  western Caribbean cruises. In April 2013 she sailed to Southampton and operated cruises to Northern Europe, the Mediterranean, and the Canary Islands. Subsequently, Crown Princess returned to the United States to Fort Lauderdale, sailing Caribbean cruises until February 2014.

On 18 January 2013, it was announced that Crown Princess would sail around South America. The Caribbean cruises from 15 February 2014 through 26 April 2014 were cancelled to allow for the South America cruise. After the South America cruise, she sailed to Mexico, Hawaii, and Pacific coastal cruises from Los Angeles, as well as Northbound and Southbound cruises from Vancouver and Whittier or round-trip Alaskan cruises from Seattle.

Starting in the 2016–2017 season she undertook a full season to South America. At the end of the season, she returned to Fort Lauderdale to sail Caribbean cruises.

As of August 2019, Crown Princess is currently sailing the British Isles and will re-position to Fort Lauderdale for the 2019-20 Winter season, sailing Southern Caribbean itineraries.

Refurbishment 
In April 2018, the ship underwent an extensive 10-day renovation in Freeport, Bahamas.

Incidents

Coronavirus pandemic 
During the coronavirus pandemic, the CDC reported, as early as 2020.04.22, that at least one person who tested positive for SARS-CoV-2 had tested positive within 14 days after disembarking.

References

External links 

 
 Video Clip of Crown Princess leaving Port Everglades

2005 ships
Ships built by Fincantieri
Ships built in Monfalcone
Ships of Princess Cruises